The 2020–21 season is Aizawl's 37th competitive season and its fourth competitive season in the I-League, India's top-flight professional football league. The season covers the period from 1 June 2020 to 31 May 2021.

Overview

August
In August 2020, Aizawl FC announced the signing of three midfielders- David Laltlansanga, Vanlalnghenga, and Thasiama. 
They retained Both Alfred Jaryan and Richard Kasagga for the upcoming season.
On 27 August they signed center back Vanlalzuidika from Chhinga Veng F.C. and on 30 August they signed another defender K.Lalmalsawma from their Mizoram Premier League rivals Electric Veng FC.
On 31 August they announced the contract extension of T. Mawia for another season.

September
On 9 and 13 September, they announced the signing of defender PC Laldinpuia and Goalkeeper Lalmuansanga respectively from their city rivals Electric Veng.

Transfers

In

Kit
Supplier: Vamos / Sponsor: NE Consultancy Services

Players

Out on loan

I-League

League table

Matches

Relegation Stage (Group B)

Matches

Goal Scorers

See also
 2020–21 in Indian football
 2020–21 I-League

References

2020–21 I-League by team
Aizawl FC seasons